Winde is an unincorporated community in Delta County, in the U.S. state of Michigan. It is located west of Perkins in Baldwin Township.

History
Winde contained a post office from 1918 until 1925. The community was named for Herman Winde, a pioneer settler.

References

Unincorporated communities in Delta County, Michigan